Simferopol is the second-largest city in the Crimean Peninsula. The city, along with the rest of Crimea, is internationally recognised as part of Ukraine, and is considered the capital of the Autonomous Republic of Crimea. However, it is under the de facto control of Russia, which annexed Crimea in 2014 and regards Simferopol as the capital of the Republic of Crimea. Simferopol is an important political, economic and transport hub of the peninsula, and serves as the administrative centre of both Simferopol Municipality and the surrounding Simferopol District. 
 
After the 1784 annexation of the Crimean Khanate by the Russian Empire, the Russian empress decreed the foundation of the city with the name Simferopol on the location of the Crimean Tatar town of Aqmescit ("White Mosque").

The population was

Etymologies
The name Simferopol comes from the Greek Sympheropoli (Symferópoli), meaning city of common good. The spelling Symferopil is also used.

In Crimean Tatar, the name of the city is Aqmescit, which literally means "The white mosque'" (Aq "white", and mescit "mosque"). But aq does not refer to the color of the mosque, but to its location. This is due to the colour designation of the cardinal points among the Turkic peoples, where white is the west. Thus, the exact translation of the name of the town is "the Western Mosque."

In English, the name was often given as Akmechet or Ak-Mechet (e.g. in Encyclopædia Britannica ), a transliteration from Russian spelling of Crimean Tatar word Акмечет, Ак-Мечеть, where Mechet (Мечеть) is the Russian word for "mosque".

History

Early history

Archaeological evidence in the Chokurcha cave shows the presence of ancient people living in the territory of modern Simferopol. The Scythian Neapolis, known by its Greek name, is also located in the city, which is the remnants of an ancient capital of the Crimean Scythians who lived on the territory from the 3rd century BC to the 4th century AD.

Later, the Crimean Tatars founded the town of Aqmescit. For some time, Aqmescit served as the residence of the Qalğa-Sultan, the second most important position in the Crimean Khanate after the Khan himself.

Russian Empire
In 1784 modern Ukrainian Simferopol was founded after the annexation of the Crimean Khanate to the Russian Empire by Catherine II of Russia. The name Simferopol is in Greek, Συμφερόπολις (Simferopolis), and literally means "the city of usefulness." The tradition to give Greek names to places in newly acquired southern territories was carried out by Empress Catherine the Great as part of her Greek Plan. In 1802, Simferopol became the administrative centre of the Taurida Governorate. During the Crimean War of 1854–1856, the Russian Imperial Army reserves and a hospital were stationed in the city. After the war, more than 30,000 Russian soldiers were buried in the city's vicinity.

20th-century wars
In the 20th century, Simferopol was once again affected by wars and conflicts in the region. At the end of the Russian Civil War, the headquarters of General Pyotr Wrangel, leader of the anti-Bolshevik White Army, were located there. On 13 November 1920, the Red Army captured the city and on 18 October 1921, Simferopol became the capital of the Crimean Autonomous Soviet Socialist Republic.

During World War II, Simferopol was occupied by Nazi Germany from 1 November 1941 to 13 April 1944. Retreating NKVD police shot a number of prisoners on 31 October 1941 in the NKVD building and the city's prison. Germans perpetrated one of the largest war-time massacres in Simferopol, killing in total over 22,000 locals—mostly Jews, Russians, Krymchaks, and Romani. On one occasion, starting 9 December 1941, the Einsatzkommando 11b, which was under the command of Werner Braune, whose main unit and superior were Einsatzgruppe D and Otto Ohlendorf, respectively, command killed an estimated 14,300 Simferopol residents; most of them were Jews.

In April 1944 the Red Army liberated Simferopol. On 18 May 1944 the Crimean Tatar population of the city, along with the whole Crimean Tatar nation of Crimea, was forcibly deported to Central Asia as collective punishment for their perceived collaboration with Nazi Germany.

Within Ukraine
On 26 April 1954, Simferopol, together with the rest of the Crimean Oblast, was transferred from the Russian Soviet Federative Socialist Republic to the Ukrainian Soviet Socialist Republic by Soviet Premier Nikita Khrushchev.

An asteroid, discovered in 1970 by Soviet astronomer Tamara Mikhailovna Smirnova, is named after the city (2141 Simferopol).

Following a referendum on 20 January 1991, the Crimean Oblast was upgraded an Autonomous Soviet Socialist Republic on 12 February 1991 by the Supreme Soviet of the Ukrainian SSR.
Simferopol became the capital of the Crimean Autonomous Soviet Socialist Republic.

After the collapse of the Soviet Union in 1991, Simferopol became the capital of the Autonomous Republic of Crimea within newly independent Ukraine. Today, the city has a population of 340,600 (2006) most of whom are ethnic Russians, with the rest being Ukrainian and Crimean Tatar minorities.

After the Crimean Tatars were allowed to return from exile in the 1990s, several new Crimean Tatar suburbs were constructed, as many more Tatars returned to the city compared to number exiled in 1944. Land ownership between the current residents and returning Crimean Tatars is a major area of conflict today with the Tatars requesting the return of lands seized after their deportation.

Russian annexation

In March of 2014, after the Revolution of Dignity, Russian forces entered Crimea and occupied it, disarming or subsuming Ukrainian units in the territory. On 16 March 2014, a referendum on independence and accession to the Russian Federation as a federal subject was unilaterally held by Russian and pro-Russian forces in Crimea. The vote, the legitimacy of which was rejected by a majority of the nations in the UN as well as by supranational and non-national organisations, showed an "overwhelming" support for joining Russia, with over 90% of participants supporting that choice. The referendum was decried as a sham by Western countries including the US, which declared that they would refuse to recognise "the results of a poll administered under threats of violence and intimidation from a Russian military intervention that violates international law." 

On 21 March, by decree of Vladimir Putin, Simferopol was named the capital of a new federal subject of the Russian Federation encompassing the majority of the peninsula, with the exception of Sevastopol, which became a federal сity. The first elections in the region after its annexation by the Russian Federation were conducted on September 14, when municipal elections were held.

Repression and war crimes under Russian occupation

Prior to the seizure of the city by Russia, a mass protest was organized by the city's Crimean Tatars in support of Crimea remaining as part of Ukraine. Subsequently, after the seizure of the peninsula and the city by Russian occupation forces, Russian authorities banned Tatar organizations, filed criminal charges against Tatar leaders and journalists, and targeted the Tatar population. This practice of collective punishment has been described as a war crime prohibited under international humanitarian law and Geneva convention.

Geography and climate

Location
Simferopol is located in the south-central portion of the Crimean Peninsula. The city lies on the Salhir River and near the artificial Simferopol Reservoir, which provides the city with clean drinking water. The Simferopol Reservoir's earth dam is the biggest in Europe.

Climate
The city experiences a humid subtropical or oceanic climate (depending on which version of the Köppen climate classification is used), near the boundary of the humid continental climate.

Politics and administrative divisions

As the capital of the Republic, Simferopol houses its political structure including the Parliament and the Council of Ministers. Simferopol is also the administrative centre of the Simferopolskyi District (raion), however, it is directly subordinate to the Crimean authorities rather than to the district authorities housed in the city itself.

The city of Simferopol is administratively divided into three districts (Zaliznychnyi, Tsentralnyi, and Kyivskyi), four urban-type settlements (Ahrarne, Aeroflotskyi, Hriesivskyi, Komsomolske) and one village (Bitumne).

Viktor Ageev became city mayor on 11 November 2010 and was then elected chairman of the Simferopol City Council on 29 September 2014.

Igor Lukashyov was installed as the head of Simferopol City administration (i.e. local executive) after Russia annexed the region in 2014. He served in this position until his dismissal on  9 November 2018.

Transportation
Simferopol has a major railway station, which serves millions of tourists each year. In December 2014 Ukraine cut the railway line to Crimea at the border. Currently, the station serves only a commuter (regional) passenger train and the Moscow – Simferopol train every day.

The city is also connected via the Simferopol International Airport, which was constructed in 1936. Zavodskoye Airport is situated southwest of Simferopol.

The city has several main bus stations, with routes towards many cities, including Sevastopol, Kerch, Yalta, and Yevpatoriya. The Crimean Trolleybus connects Simferopol to the city of Yalta on Crimean Black Sea coast.

The streets of Simferopol have a rare house numbering – the odd numbers are on the right side of the road, looking in the direction in which the numbers increase.

Demographics
At the last census in 2014, the population of Simferopol was 332,317, the highest of any city in the Republic of Crimea and second only to Sevastopol within the Crimean peninsula.

Economy
When it existed, Crimea Air had its head office on the grounds of Simferopol Airport. Simferopol hosts some industries, such as 'Zavod 'Phiolent' JSC producing Marine automation control systems; Precise electrical micro machines of low input power; Power tools, for both professional and household usage.
 Simferopol Airport , new terminal is to be open with at least 8 gates, the structure of the hall has a wave-like layout.

Industry
 Fiolent (two locations)
 Simferopol chemical industry plants
 PO Foton
 Simferopol Airport
 SEM SElktroMash SELMZ
 Plastotekhnika and else plastics related
 Santekhprom SSTP
 PEK PromElektroKontakt and PromSchitKontakt, ChPO Sfera IzmertelnPribor, SELTZ ElectroTechnical Plant
 Pnevmatika, other pneumatics tires etc. related industry
 Monolit SMZKon, TsSI Tavrida SKMKZ, Slava Truda SCMNG, SiMZ Motor Plants
 Chornomornaftogaz
 Digital Valley (Tsifrovaya Dolina): silicon industry, computers, wafers and microelectronics, it, other related. It will located (most likely) near the airport for convenience.

Education
The largest collection of higher education institutions in Crimea is located in Simferopol. Among them is the largest university in Simferopol and Crimea, the Taurida V.Vernadsky National University, which was founded in 1917. Crimea State Medical University named after S. I. Georgievsky, also located in Simferopol, is one of the most prominent medical schools of Ukraine. The Crimean Medical University is situated on the plot, where in 1855 a nursery garden was planted by the founder of the Nikita Botanical Gardens Ch.Ch.Steven (1781–1863). In 1863–66 a school for girls was built here and in 1931 a medical institute was opened. On the same plot P.Krzhizhanovsky built a three-storey hostel for medical students after the design in 1934. The building with clear geometric masses was completed in 1938. A new federal university campus was opened 4 August 2014.

Sports
Simferopol is home to the football club FC TSK Simferopol which plays in the Crimean Premier League. It was formed as a Russian club in 2014, following the 2014 Crimean Conflict, to replace the Ukrainian club Tavriya Simferopol which had been the first winners of the Ukraine Premier League, and also won the Ukrainian Cup in 2010.

Notable people

Max Alpert (1899–1980) a Soviet photographer, frontiline work during WWII
Andrei Abrikosov (1906–1973) a Soviet stage and film actor.
Reşat Amet (1975–2014) a Crimean Tatar activist
Denis Bouriakov (born 1981), principal flautist of the Los Angeles Philharmonic
Rachel Devirys (1890-1983) French film actress, starred in some 50 films from 1916 to 1956.
Dorofeeva (born 1990), female vocalist of the pop duo Vremya i Steklo
Roman Filippov (1936–1992) a Soviet theatre and film actor
Viktor Grebennikov (1927–2001) scientist, naturalist, entomologist and paranormal researcher
Adolph Joffe (1883–1927) Communist revolutionary, Bolshevik politician and Soviet diplomat
Sergey Karjakin (born 1990), Chess prodigy and grandmaster at age 12 years, 7 months
Olexandr Kolchenko (born 1989) a Ukrainian left-wing anarchist, ecologist and archaeologist
Oleg Kotov (born 1965), Air Force colonel, 15 Soyuz flight commander and flight engineer
Andrey Kozenko (born 1981), a Russian and former Ukrainian statesman and politician.
Nicolai Ivanovich Kravchenko (1867–1941) a Russian battle painter, journalist and writer.
Anna Kuliscioff (1857–1925) a revolutionary, feminist, anarchist and Marxist socialist militant. 
Zara Levina (1906–1976) a Soviet pianist and composer.
Saint Luke of Simferopol (1877–1961), born Valentin Felixovich Voino-Yasenetsky, Russian surgeon and Archbishop of Simferopol
Musa Mamut (1931–1978) a deported Crimean Tatar who immolated himself in Crimea
Yuri Manin (1937–2023) a Russian mathematician, worked on algebraic & diophantine geometry
Alisa Melekhina (born 1991), chess master, attorney and classically trained ballerina
Sergey Mergelyan (1928–2008), a Soviet Armenian mathematician and scientist
Gennady Samokhin (born 1971) a Crimean speleologist, holds the depth world record of cave diving
Ilya Selvinsky (1899–1968) was a Soviet Jewish poet, dramatist, memoirist and essayist
Oleg Sentsov (born 1976) a Ukrainian filmmaker, writer and activist from Crimea. 
Valery Sigalevitch (born 1950), a Russian classical concert pianist, lives in La Rochelle.
Bob Sredersas (1910–1982) a Lithuanian-Australian art collector. 
Alexei Stepanov (1858–1923), a Russian genre painter, illustrator and art teacher.
Evhen Tsybulenko (born 1972), Estonian professor of international law
Georges Vitaly (1917–2007), French actor, theatre director and theatre manager.
Evgenii Wulff (1885–1941) a Crimean Russian Soviet biologist, botanist and plant geographer.
Diana Tishchenko (born 1990), Ukrainian classical violinist

Sport 

Gleb Bakshi (born 1995) boxer, bronze medallist at the 2020 Summer Olympics. 
Lyudmila Blonska (born 1977), Ukrainian heptathlete, banned after 2 doping offences
Serhiy Dotsenko (born 1979) Russian boxer, silver medallist at the 2000 Summer Olympics
Andriy Hryvko (born 1983), a Ukrainian cyclist who rides for Astana
Daniil Khlusevich (born 2001), Russian international footballer who plays for Spartak Moscow
Yana Klochkova (born 1982), a Ukrainian swimmer with five Olympic medals, four being gold
Natalia Popova (born 1993) former figure skater, five-time Ukrainian national champion 
Hanna Rizatdinova (born 1993), individual rhythmic gymnast, bronze medallist at the 2016 Summer Olympics
Kateryna Serebrianska (born 1977), individual rhythmic gymnast, gold medallist at the 1996 Summer Olympics
Oleksandr Usyk (born 1987), heavyweight boxer, gold medallist at the 2012 Summer Olympics

International relations

Twin towns – Sister cities

Simferopol is currently twinned with:
  Salem, Oregon, United States (1986)
  Heidelberg, Germany (1991)
  Kecskemét, Hungary (2006)
  Tepebaşı, Turkey (2007)
  Bursa, Turkey 
  Irkutsk, Russia (2008)
  Moscow, Russia (2008)
  Novocherkassk, Russia (2008)
  Omsk, Russia (2008)
  Ruse, Bulgaria (2008)
  Nizhny Novgorod, Russia (2016)

References

External links

Simferopol Government Official website
The murder of the Jews of Simferopol during World War II, at Yad Vashem website.

 
Simferopol Municipality
Cities in Crimea
Simferopolsky Uyezd
Populated places established in 1784
Cities of regional significance in Ukraine
Populated places established in the Russian Empire
Holocaust locations in Ukraine